Trond Bakkevig  (born 22 November 1948) is a Norwegian priest and organizational leader, an active participant in contemporary debate.

He was born in Oslo, and graduated in theology with the thesis Ordningsteologi og atomvåpen in 1984. He was awarded the Gunnar Sønsteby Prize in 2016.

References

1948 births
Living people
Clergy from Oslo
Norwegian theologians